Dr. Gonzo may refer to:

Oscar Zeta Acosta, pseudonym from Hunter S. Thompson's Fear and Loathing in Las Vegas
John Means (comedian), stand-up comic who used it as a stage name
Derwyddon Dr Gonzo, a Welsh language band
Dr Gonzo (album), a 2011 album by Crookers

See also
 Gonzo (disambiguation)